City Wall and Moat is located in Beirut, Lebanon.

Overview
Built around the 9th century, Beirut’s city wall was dismantled at the beginning of the 20th century. Souk Al-Jamil was built over the backfilled moat.

Construction
Archaeologists have not been able to provide a precise date for the construction of the city wall and its moat, although historical chronicles suggest the 9th century.

History
Located outside the city wall, the moat played an important defensive role in times of war. It kept the invaders at a distance, and prevented them from getting close to the wall with their mobile wooden towers. Attackers had to construct bridges from their wooden towers in order to reach the top of the wall, thus exposing themselves to the defenders of the city. Archaeologists have not been able to provide a precise date for the construction of the city wall and its moat, although historical chronicles suggest the 9th century. Both wall and moat were built atop the Phoenician cemetery, and cut across the ruins of the Phoenico-Persian, Hellenistic and Roman residences. In the late 19th century, the city wall and its moat lost their strategic significance. By the early 1900s, the wall had been dismantled, and Souk Al-Jamil was built over the backfilled moat.

Timeline
9th century: Suggested date for the construction of the city wall and the moat by archaeologists.

Late 19th century: The city wall and moat lost their strategic significance.

1900s: The wall was dismantled.

See also
City wall
Moat
Souk Al-Jamil

References 
{{Curvers, Hans H. and Stuart, Barbara (1996) “Bey 008, The 1994 Results”, Bulletin d’Archéologie et d’Architecture Libanaises 1: 228-234.

El-Masri, Sami (1999) Beirut: The City and its Crafts in the Medieval Period. Ph.D. Dissertation, Freie Universität, Berlin.

Mongne, Pascal (1996)  « Bey 008 bis, Zone des Souks, Dégagement du fossé médiéval », Bulletin d’Archéologie et d’Architecture Libanaises  1 :270-293.}}

Buildings and structures in Beirut
Monuments and memorials in Lebanon
Tourist attractions in Beirut